Evergrande Football School is a football school located in Qingyuan, Guangdong, China. Owned by the Evergrande Group, it is a full-time boarding primary and secondary football school.

References

Sport schools in China
Football academies in Asia
Guangzhou F.C.